The 1994 EHF European Women's Handball Championship was held in Germany from 17–25 September. It was won by Denmark after beating Germany 27–23 in the final match.

Venues 
The European Championships were held in the following cities:
 Waiblingen
 Bonn
 Oldenburg
 Magdeburg

Teams

Preliminary round

Group A

Group B

Eleventh place game

Ninth place game

Seventh place game

Fifth place game

Final round

Semifinals

Bronze medal match

Gold medal match

Final ranking 

 
European Women's Handball Championship
H
1994 in German women's sport
Women's handball in Germany
European Women's Handball Championship
September 1994 sports events in Europe